Jamalabad-e Qadiri (also Romanized as Jamālābād-e Qadīrī; also known as Jamālābād) is a village in Jahadabad Rural District, in the Central District of Anbarabad County, Kerman Province, Iran. At the 2006 census, its population was 38, in 5 families.

References 

Populated places in Anbarabad County